Lockwood & Co. is a British supernatural  detective thriller television series developed by Joe Cornish for Netflix based on Jonathan Stroud's book series of the same name. Consisting of eight episodes, it premiered on 27 January 2023. It follows the plots of the first two books, The Screaming Staircase and The Whispering Skull.

Premise
In an alternate version of present-day Britain, ghosts who are deadly to the touch have been rising from their graves for the past 50 years. Adults cannot sense the ghosts, but children can, so teenagers have been organised into licensed ghost-hunting agencies to detect and dispose of threats. Lucy Carlyle, a psychically gifted teenager, has run away from home and come to London in the hope of catching on at an agency. Running out of options, she applies for a job at a tiny outfit run by two boys from an old townhouse: Lockwood & Co.

Cast and characters

Main
 Ruby Stokes as Lucy Carlyle
 Cameron Chapman as Anthony Lockwood
 Ali Hadji-Heshmati as George Karim

Recurring
 Ivanno Jeremiah as Inspector Montagu Barnes
 Jack Bandeira as Quill Kipps
 Rhianna Dorris as Kat Godwin
 Paddy Holland as Bobby Vernon
 Rico Vina as Ned Shaw
 Bronwyn James as Sergeant Wade
 Louise Brealey as Pamela Joplin

Guest
 Lily Newmark as Norrie White
 Ishtar Currie-Wilson as Annabel Ward
 Nigel Planer as Sir John Fairfax
 Morven Christie as Penelope Fittes
 Jeff Rawle as Sebastian Saunders
 Michael Clarke as the Skull
 Amanda Abbington as Marissa Fittes
 Hayley Konadu as Florence Bonnard / Flo Bones
 Ben Crompton as Julius Winkman
 Alice Lowe as Adelaide Winkman
 Luke Treadaway as The Golden Blade

Episodes

Production

Development 
In 2017 it was announced that Nira Park and Rachael Prior had optioned the rights to Jonathan Stroud's Lockwood & Co. book series while at Big Talk Productions. In 2019 they left Big Talk to set up Complete Fiction Pictures and produced the TV series under their new banner. On 19 May 2020, it was announced that Complete Fiction was working with Netflix to develop the series, and Joe Cornish was set to helm and executive produce the series. In December 2020, Netflix officially gave an eight-episode series order to Lockwood & Co. Cornish serves as the lead writer and director. Nira Park, Rachael Prior, and Cornish serve as executive producers. William McGregor was also involved in directing several episodes.

Ed Hime, Kara Smith, and Joy Wilkinson are the series' writers.

Casting
The cast was confirmed in March 2022 with Ruby Stokes, Cameron Chapman and Ali Hadji-Heshmati set to star alongside Ivanno Jeremiah, Luke Treadaway and Morven Christie. Also joining the cast were Jack Bandeira, Ben Crompton, Hayley Konadu, Rhianna Dorris and Paddy Holland.

Filming 
Filming began on July 5, 2021 in London. Filming occurred at the Kensal Green Cemetery in late October 2021. The series wrapped on 15 March 2022 in London.

Music
Joe Cornish chose to include in the series songs relying on early goth rock from the repertoire of Bauhaus, the Cure, Siouxsie and the Banshees and This Mortal Coil. Journalist Matthew Mahler noted: "The score seems [...] to create a truly supernatural aural palette." 

Commenting on the music, Cornish said: "We went back to a lot of post-punk, [...] music like Siouxsie and the Banshees and The Cure and Bauhaus that have this kind of romantic, doom-laden spookiness to them, and they feel very analog". "They feel alive, they feel haunted, and they have a terrific, beautiful melancholy to them. We had a playlist very early on of those tracks of Bauhaus and Siouxsie and The Cure". A lot of the bands are referenced in posters in characters' rooms like Lucy's.

Reception

Critical Reception 
The review aggregator website Rotten Tomatoes reported a 90% approval rating with an average rating of 7.40/10, based on 10 critic reviews. The website's critics consensus reads, "A paranormal procedural steered by writer-producer Joe Cornish's usual deft hand, Lockwood & Co. is a fun-filled adventure carried off with sprightly charm." Metacritic, which uses a weighted average, assigned a score of 78 out of 100 based on 6 critics, indicating "generally favorable reviews".

Leila Latif of The Guardian wrote: "Lockwood and Co is a delight, with a level of intelligence and respect for its source material, its characters and its audience."

Writing in  Empire magazine, Boyd Hilton said: "Forget the YA [young adult] label; this is an addictive, sophisticated supernatural thriller which will keep cynical old duffers entertained throughout."

Audience Viewership 
Lockwood & Co. featured in the Netflix global top 10s for 3 weeks between January 22 and February 12 picking up 79.91 million hours.

References

External links 

  

2023 British television series debuts
2020s supernatural television series
2020s British drama television series
British supernatural television shows
English-language Netflix original programming
Television shows based on British novels
Television shows shot in London
British detective television series
British adventure television series
British thriller television series
Television shows filmed at Pinewood Studios